Anna Bård (born 2 April 1980 in Copenhagen, Denmark) is a Danish actress and model.

She has appeared in numerous commercials on Danish TV, but she has also starred in a couple of Danish films. She also guest appeared in an episode of the Danish sitcom Klovn, in episode 19: "Franks fede ferie".

In 2006, Anna Bård appeared on the Danish edition of Deal or no deal, as one of the suitcase girls.

Filmography 
 Regel nr. 1 (2003),  BJ-girl
 Overlagt (2004),  Louise
 Betonhjerter (2005), Sussie
 Brutal Incasso (2005), Louise
 Far til fire - i stor stil (2006), girl
 Westbrick Murders (2007), Barbara
 Pistoleros (2007), Stripper

Television 
 Klovn (2005), beach girl
 Deal or No Deal (Denmark) (2006), suitcase girl #11
 2900 Happiness (2008), Lea

External links 
 

1980 births
Danish stage actresses
Danish television actresses
Living people
Actresses from Copenhagen